Big Brother 2006 was the second season of the Finnish reality television season Big Brother. It aired on SubTV in Finland, from 29 August 2006 to 1 December 2006, and lasted 96 days.
A number of contestants (known as "housemates") lived in a purpose-built house in Espoo, and were isolated from the rest of the world. Each week, each housemate nominated two of their peers for eviction, and the housemates who received the most nominations would face a public vote. Of these, one would eventually leave, having been "evicted" from the house. However, there sometimes were exceptions to this process as dictated by Big Brother, known as "twists". In the final week, there were four housemates remaining, and the public voted for who they wanted to win. Sari Nygren received the most votes, and won the prize money of €50,000. The series's final broadcast obtained a peak audience of 540,000 viewers.

Housemates
Twelve housemates entered the house at Launch. Sari was the twelfth housemate, chosen by the public, to enter the house. Six other housemates entered the house during the season, creating a total of eighteen housemates competing in Big Brother 2006. One of these six housemates was a replacement housemate Sorella, who was introduced to the housemates on Day 21, after the departure of Henri. On Day 36, five more housemates (Olli, Piritta, Jani, Mia, Jaakko) entered the house, totaling 18 housemates. Two housemates (Heidi and Mika) were ejected from the house. On Day 84, it was revealed that an old housemate would re-enter the house on the following week. Jenni, Kaarlo and Mira received the most votes in the first round, so the final vote was between the three of them. After receiving 43,8% of all votes, Kaarlo became eligible to win the prize money and re-entered the house on Day 91.

Voting format
In the 2005 season of Big Brother Suomi, viewers could only vote to evict the nominated housemates they wanted to leave the house. Big Brother 2006 added the save vote. Any viewer may cast as many evict or save votes as they choose. Prior to eviction each housemates' evict votes were merged with their save votes; the housemate with the lowest number of save votes remaining after the merge is evicted.

Alleged sexual abuse controversy

On September 26, Mika was removed from the house for the alleged attempt to sexually abuse a fellow female housemate, Sorella. After a party, on Day 25, Sorella and Mika ended up in the same bed at the end of the night. After Sorella had, seemingly, passed out, Mika tried to lower her jeans and finger her. Big Brother stopped Mika by ordering him to come to the Diary Room. The incident is undergoing police investigation.

Nominations table
The first housemate listed in each cell is nominated for two points, while the second housemate listed is nominated for one point.

Notes
: As a new housemate, Sorella could nominate but could not be nominated by her fellow housemates.
: As punishment for Kaarlo and Sari breaking multiple house rules, nominations were cancelled, and both were automatically nominated by Big Brother.
: As punishment for attempting to talk in code, Hanne and Piritta were given 3 nomination points by Big Brother. Had this not happened, only Mia and Mira would have faced the public vote.
: This week, Mia won immunity through a dance competition task on Day 64. She could nominate, but could not be nominated by her fellow housemates.
: On Day 86, the public was given the opportunity to vote one of the evicted housemates back into the house, making them eligible to win. The evicted housemates participating in this vote were Ari, Henri, Jenni, Kaarlo, Mia, Mira, Mirka and Tatu. Jani, Jaakko, Piritta and Sorella did not participate in the vote. On Day 87, it was revealed that Jenni, Kaarlo and Mira received the most votes to return and would move on to the second round of the vote. On Day 91, it was revealed that Kaarlo had received the most votes to return. He entered the house shortly after Hanne's eviction.
: Following Kaarlo's re-entry into the house, the lines opened for the public to vote for a winner.

References

External links
Official website 

2006 Finnish television seasons
02